Luke Chapman (born 21 August 1998) is an English cricketer. He made his first-class debut on 28 March 2017 for Cambridge MCCU against Nottinghamshire as part of the Marylebone Cricket Club University fixtures.

References

External links
 

1998 births
Living people
English cricketers
Place of birth missing (living people)
Hertfordshire cricketers
Cambridge MCCU cricketers
English cricketers of the 21st century